Mafan (also Romanized as Māfān; also known as Māfūn and Mārfan) is a village in Chahar Gonbad Rural District, in the Central District of Sirjan County, Kerman Province, Iran. At the 2006 census, its population was 43, in 14 families.

References 

Populated places in Sirjan County